The National Basketball League Scoring Champion is an annual National Basketball League (NBL) award given since the league's inaugural season to the player with the highest points per game average of the regular season. The winner receives the Alan Bland Memorial Trophy, which is named in honour of Bland, a Wellington native who played for the New Zealand men's national basketball team during the 1960s.

Winners 

|}

See also
 List of National Basketball League (New Zealand) awards

References

Awards established in 1982
Scor
S
1982 establishments in New Zealand